Hermetia is a genus of flies of the family Stratiomyidae.

Species

References

Stratiomyidae
Brachycera genera
Taxa named by Pierre André Latreille
Diptera of North America
Diptera of South America
Diptera of Australasia
Diptera of Asia